Peeler Lake is a California landform within the Toiyabe National Forest and on the west edge of the Hoover Wilderness. One of the few bodies of water on the Great Basin Divide, Peeler Lake's inflow is sufficient for outlet streams over 2 Sierra Crest sills of similar elevation to respectively drain westward to the Pacific Ocean (Rancheria Creek, Tuolumne & San Joaquin Rivers, and Suisun & San Francisco Bays) and eastward into the Great Basin (Robinson Creek, East Walker & Walker Rivers, Walker Lake sink).

Peeler Lake was named in 1925 for Barney Peeler (1833-1920) of nearby Bridgeport (as was Barney Lake downstream to the east), and the lake was added to the Geographic Names Information System in 2000.  In 2006, an environmental evaluation of the lake concluded "the nitrate concentration of 17 μeq/L to be too high to come from atmospheric deposition alone."

See also
List of lakes in California

References

Humboldt–Toiyabe National Forest
Lakes of Mono County, California
Mountain passes of the Sierra Nevada (United States)
Lakes of California
Lakes of Northern California